The Wounded Cuirassier (French: Le Cuirassier blessé quittant le feu) is an oil painting of a single anonymous soldier descending a slope with his nervous horse by the French Romantic painter and lithographer Théodore Géricault (1791–1824). In this 1814 Salon entry, Géricault decided to turn away from scenes of heroism in favor of a subject that is on the losing side of the battle. On display in the aftermath of France's disastrous military campaign in Russia, this life-size painting captured the feeling of a nation in defeat. There are no visible wounds on the figure, and the title has sometimes been interpreted to refer to soldier's injured pride. The painting stood in stark contrast with Géricault's Charging Chasseur, as it didn't focus on glory or the spectacle of battle. Only his Signboard of a Hoofsmith, which is currently in a private collection, bears any resemblance in form or function to this painting.

The final salon version of The Wounded Cuirassier is at the Musée du Louvre and the smaller, study version, is located at the Brooklyn Museum.

Artist and Setting
Théodore Géricault was born in Rouen, France in 1791 and studied art in the classroom from a young age. He went on to study in Paris where he created his first major work, The Charging Chasseur, for the Paris Salon of 1812. His next major Salon submission was The Wounded Cuirassier in 1814.

In the months before the exhibition, Paris fell to the sixth coalition and Napoleon was defeated and exiled from France. After The Wounded Cuirassier received a negative response from critics, Géricault entered a long period of artistic study, and in 1816 he left France to find inspiration in Rome.

Creation 
Géricault rushed to make The Wounded Cuirassier in only three weeks and created five separate sketches and drafts before the final version. Perhaps as a result of its hurried production, the message of the painting was not entirely clear to critics.

Style and Composition 
Géricault uses a similar style and technique to his previous works, yet his approach to battle painting was unique in the period. He elected not to show a wound on the soldier, perhaps suggesting to viewers that the wound is internal and extends to the nation. The soldier and horse are shown in a tense and vulnerable state; the soldier uses his sword as a sort of crutch. Géricault also used the horse to convey emotion. In The Wounded Cuirassier, he uses the horse's facial expressions and uneasy footing to emphasize the unsteadiness and terror of the soldier.

External links
The Wounded Cuirassier at the Brooklyn Museum website.
 Cuirassier blessé quittant le feu at the Louvre official site (in French)

References

Paintings in the Louvre by French artists
1814 paintings
Paintings in the collection of the Brooklyn Museum
Horses in art
Paintings by Théodore Géricault